Edmund Ray Stevens (June 20, 1869August 25, 1930) was an American lawyer and judge.  He was a justice of the Wisconsin Supreme Court from 1926 until his death in 1930.  He previously served 23 years as a Wisconsin circuit court judge, and was a member of the Wisconsin State Assembly, representing the city of Madison in the 1901 session.

Biography
Stevens was born Edmund Ray Stevens on June 20, 1869, in Lake County, Illinois. His family later moved to Janesville, Wisconsin. He graduated from the University of Wisconsin Law School in 1895.  As a young man, he was a prolific writer on the problems of government and pushing for progressive solutions.  He also worked as a special correspondent for the Milwaukee Sentinel, making trips to Europe to report on the urban European perspective.

Career
From 1896 to 1903, Stevens and future U.S. Representative Burr W. Jones operated the law firm Jones & Stevens. Additionally, Stevens was elected to the Wisconsin State Assembly in 1900.  In 1903, Stevens was appointed a Wisconsin circuit court judge by Governor Robert M. La Follette.  He was elected to the Supreme Court in 1925 and served as a member until his death. During his time with the Supreme Court, he was also a lecturer at the University of Wisconsin Law School.

Stevens died at his home in the Nakoma neighborhood, in Madison, Wisconsin, on the morning of August 25, 1930.  He suffered a brief illness that resulted in a heart attack.

Personal life and family
Stevens married Kate Sabin of Windsor, Wisconsin.  Sabin was also a University of Wisconsin graduate; she worked as a high school teacher in Stevens Point, Wisconsin, served as Dane County superintendent of schools, and taught at the Milwaukee-Downer College.  They had three children together, though one died young.

Electoral history

Wisconsin Assembly (1900)

| colspan="6" style="text-align:center;background-color: #e9e9e9;"| General Election, November 6, 1900

Wisconsin Supreme Court (1925)

| colspan="6" style="text-align:center;background-color: #e9e9e9;"| General Election, April 7, 1925

References

1869 births
1930 deaths
People from Lake County, Illinois
Politicians from Janesville, Wisconsin
Justices of the Wisconsin Supreme Court
Republican Party members of the Wisconsin State Assembly
Wisconsin lawyers
University of Wisconsin Law School alumni
University of Wisconsin–Madison faculty